Kinesin-like protein KIF24 is a protein that in humans is encoded by the KIF24 gene.

References

Further reading